Stadion Nikola Mantov is a multi-purpose stadium in Kočani, North Macedonia.  It is mostly used for football matches and is currently the home stadium of FK Osogovo Kočani. The stadium seats 5,000 people.

Name
In 1973, during a football match between FK Osogovo and FK FAS 11 Oktomvri from Skopje, the 23-year-old Nikola Mantov - one of the best players of FK Osogovo at the time - collapsed on the field and died. In his honor, the home-ground of FK Osogovo is named Nikola Mantov Stadium. It is one of the few football stadium in North Macedonia named after a football player.

International fixtures

References

External links
Stadion Nikola Mantov
Macedonian Football 
Football Federation of North Macedonia 

FK Osogovo
Football venues in North Macedonia
Multi-purpose stadiums in North Macedonia
Kočani